Dixie Whatley is an American television personality, an early co-host of the syndicated gossip and entertainment round-up program Entertainment Tonight during 1981–1982.

After Mary Hart took over as co-anchor in 1982, Whatley continued as an ET correspondent for about four more years. She also co-hosted a movie review program, At the Movies, with Rex Reed. She has been a host, anchor, and correspondent for various other entertainment and movie review programs over the years.

Whatley is also a photographic artist and stone sculptor. Her mother and sister have also worked in the entertainment industry.

Prior to Entertainment Tonight, Whatley was a contestant on Break the Bank on April 22, 1976.

References

External links

 
 Official website

American infotainers
American women journalists
American television personalities
American women television personalities
Living people
Year of birth missing (living people)
21st-century American women
American film critics